Good Old Koerner, Ray & Glover is an album by Koerner, Ray & Glover, released in 1972.

History 
Good Old Koerner, Ray & Glover is a collection of live recordings from the trio's performances at the St. Olaf College folk festivals in 1963 and 1964. It was 24 years before their next release. The album is out of print.

Track listing

Side one
 "Black Jack Davy" (traditional, Carter Family) 
 "Down to Louisiana" (Muddy Waters, Lightnin' Hopkins)
 "Too Bad" (John Koerner)
 "Dust My Broom" (Robert Johnson)
 "Black Snake Moan" (Lead Belly)
 "Mumblin' Word" (traditional, Lead Belly)
 "Two Trains" (Waters)

Side two
 "Drunken Instrumental" (Tony Glover, Dave Ray)
 "Love to You" (Willie Dixon, Waters)
 "Special Agent" (Sleepy John Estes)
 "Mean Ol' Southern" (Arthur Crudup)
 "Love Bug" (Koerner)
 "Linin' Track" (traditional, Lead Belly)

Personnel
Tony "Little Sun" Glover – harmonica, vocals
"Spider" John Koerner – guitar, vocals
Dave "Snaker" Ray – guitar, vocals

References

External links
Koerner, Ray and Glover discography

Koerner, Ray & Glover albums
1972 live albums